Mark Brunnegger (born 1 November 1985 in Graz) is an Austrian ice hockey defenceman currently playing for the Graz 99ers of the Erste Bank Hockey League.

Playing career
Brunnegger has been with his hometown team since 2001 and has been a regular in the 99ers team since 2003.

Career statistics

References

External links

1985 births
Austrian ice hockey defencemen
Graz 99ers players
Living people
Sportspeople from Graz